Moontown is an unincorporated community in Madison County, Alabama, United States. It contains the Moontown Airport.

References

Unincorporated communities in Madison County, Alabama
Unincorporated communities in Alabama